Arno Harutyunovich Babajanian (January 22, 1921 – November 11, 1983) was a Soviet and Armenian composer and pianist. He was made a People's Artist of the USSR in 1971.

Biography
Babajanian was born in Yerevan on January 22, 1921. By the age 5, his musical talent was apparent, and the composer Aram Khachaturian suggested that the boy be given proper music training. Two years later, in 1928, Babajanian entered the Komitas State Conservatory of Yerevan. In 1938, he continued his studies in Moscow with Vissarion Shebalin.

He later returned to Yerevan, where from 1950 to 1956 he taught at the conservatory. In 1952, he wrote the Piano Trio in F-sharp minor. It received immediate acclaim and was regarded as a masterpiece from the time of its premiere. Subsequently, he undertook concert tours throughout the Soviet Union and Europe. In 1971, he was named a People's Artist of the USSR.

Babajanian wrote in various musical genres, including many popular songs in collaboration with leading poets such as Yevgeny Yevtushenko and Robert Rozhdestvensky. Much of his music is rooted in Armenian folk music and folklore, which he generally uses in the virtuosic style of Rachmaninoff and Khachaturian. His later works were influenced by Prokofiev and Bartók. Praised by Dmitri Shostakovich as a "brilliant piano teacher", Babajanian was also a noted pianist and often performed his own works in concerts.

List of principal works

Piano works

for piano solo
 Prelude (1938)
 Vagharshapat dance (1943)
 Impromptu (1944)
 Polyphonic sonata (1946, revised 1956)
 Capriccio (1951)
 Six pictures (1963–64)
 Poem (1965)
 Meditation (1969)
 Melody and Humoresque (1970)
 Elegy (1978)

for two pianos
(co-composed by Alexander Arutiunian)
 Dance (early 1940s)
 Armenian Rhapsody (1950)
 Festive (1960, includes percussive instruments)

Works for solo instrument and piano
 Violin sonata (1958)
 Air and Dance for Cello (1961)

Chamber works
 String quartet No. 1 (1938)
 String quartet No. 2 (1947?)
 Piano trio (1952)
 String quartet No. 3 (1976)

Orchestral works
 Poem-rhapsody (1954, revised 1980)
 March of the Soviet Police (1977)

Concerto
 Piano concerto (1944)
 Violin concerto (1948)
 "Heroic ballade" for piano and orchestra (1950)
 Cello concerto (1962)

Ballet pieces
 "Parvana" (Парвана) (1954–56; incomplete, probably lost)
 "Pas-de-deux" (Па-де-де)
 "Stellar symphony" (Звездная симфония) (early 1960s)
 "Umbrellas" (Зонтики)
 "Sensation" (Сенсация)

Pieces for stage orchestra
 Armenian Lipsi
 Rhythmic dance
 In Karlovy Vary
 Come to Yerevan
 Festive Yerevan
 Nocturne (Concert piece for piano and orchestra) (1980)
 Dreams (Concert piece for piano and orchestra) (1982)

Film scores
 Looking for the addressee (В поисках адресата) (1955)
 Path of thunder (Тропою грома) (1956)
 Personally known (Лично известен) (1957)
 The Song of First Love (Песня первой любви) (1958)
 A Groom from the Other World (Жених с того света) (1958)
 Bride from the North (Невеста с севера) (1975)
 My heart is in the Highlands (В горах мое сердце) (1975)
 Baghdasar's divorce (Багдасар разводится с женой) (1976)
 Chef contest (Приехали на конкурс повара) (1977)
 The flight starts from the Earth (Полет начинается с земли) (1980)
 The mechanics of happiness (Механика счастья) (1982)

Songs (over 200 in total; selection)
 "Nocturne" ("Ноктюрн")
 "Bring me back the music" (""Верни мне музыку")
 "Beauty queen" ("Королева красоты")  
 "Wedding" ("Свадьба") 
 "Best city in the world" ("Лучший город Земли"), originally performed by Jean Tatlian and made a classic by Muslim Magomayev
 "Grateful to you" ("Благодарю тебя") 
 "Ferris wheel" ("Чертово колесо") 
 "Heart on snow" ("Сердце на снегу")
 "The blue taiga" ("Голубая тайга")
 "Dum spiro, spero" (Пока я помню, я живу)

Honors, prizes and medals

 1935 - First two prizes for two songs dedicated to the 15th anniversary of Soviet Armenia
 1937 - First prize for the best performance of Alexander Glazunov's Piano Variations at Yerevan Conservatoire
 1939 - First prize for the best performance of works by Soviet composers
 1945 - Medal "for defence of the Caucasus"
 1945 - Medal "for valiant labour"
 1947 - Second prize for three piano pieces (or the Piano Concerto) at the 1st World Festival of Youth and Students in Prague
 1951 - Stalin Prize, third degree, for the "Heroic Ballade" for piano and orchestra
 1953 - Second prize for the song "Fly Aloft the Friendship Banner" at the 2nd World Festival of Youth and Students in Bucharest
 1956 - Order of the Red Banner of Labour
 1956 - Meritorious Artist of the Armenian SSR
 1962 - People's Artist of the Armenian SSR
 1967 - Armenian SSR State prize for "6 pictures" for piano solo
 1971 - People's Artist of the USSR
 1973 - Best composer's award at the 2nd Tokyo Music Festival for the song "Ferris wheel"
 1973 - Honorable citizen of two cities in Texas
 1981 - Order of Lenin
 1983 (posthumously) - Armenian SSR State prize for the OST for the film "Mechanics of happiness"

A minor planet, 9017 Babadzhanyan, was named after him.

Legacy
Babajanian is widely regarded as one of the greatest composers of the Soviet era.

References

External links

Arno Babajanian Piano Trio in f# minor sound-bites and short bio

1921 births
1983 deaths
20th-century classical composers
Armenian classical pianists
Ethnic Armenian composers
Soviet classical pianists
20th-century classical pianists
Soviet composers
Soviet male composers
Musicians from Yerevan
People's Artists of Armenia
People's Artists of the USSR
Recipients of the Order of the Red Banner of Labour
Stalin Prize winners
Komitas State Conservatory of Yerevan alumni
Armenian film score composers
20th-century male musicians